3×3 Eyes (pronounced Sazan Aizu in Japanese) is a Japanese manga series written and illustrated by Yuzo Takada. It was serialized in Kodansha's seinen manga magazines Young Magazine Kaizokuban and Weekly Young Magazine from 1987 to 2002, spanning to a total of 40 volumes. The English language translation was published by Dark Horse Comics, but was discontinued after the release of volume 8 in 2004.

Two original video animation (OVA) adaptations were released in 1991 and 1995. The first consists of four episodes averaging to half-hour of runtime and the second consists of three averaging out to 45 minutes of runtime. In the United States, the first OVA was first distributed by Streamline Pictures and the second was distributed by Orion Pictures shortly after the Japanese releases. The two OVAs were re-released in 2001 by Pioneer Entertainment in a collected set. There are also several 3×3 Eyes companion books, drama CDs, and video games, only released in Japan.

In 1993, 3×3 Eyes won the Kodansha Manga Award for the shōnen category.

Plot

3×3 Eyes follows the adventures of Pai, the last remaining , and her new Wu (Chinese reading of 无; an immortal companion), Yakumo, as they desperately try to find a way to make Pai human so that she can forget her troubled past. Pai travelled to Tokyo searching for the artifact, but shortly after she arrived, a thief snatched her backpack and cane from her. A teenage lad, Yakumo, tackled the crook and managed to get the pack back for her, though the thief escaped with the cane. Yakumo took her to his work, where Pai was able to get cleaned up, and where she discovered that he was the son of Professor Fujii, an archaeologist she had met in Tibet four years prior. The Professor had been researching the legends of the Sanjiyans and had befriended her and offered to help her find the Ningen, only to fall ill and die. Pai had his last letter to his son in her backpack, which asked Yakumo to help Pai with her quest. Although he didn't believe his father's tales of Pai being a monster, he agreed to assist her.

Their discussion was interrupted by news reports of a giant monster flying over the city. Pai recognised the creature as her pet Takuhi, who must have been released from his home in Pai's cane by the thief, and who was now looking for her. Pai set out to retrieve him, with Yakumo close behind. However when Yakumo saw Takuhi fly towards Pai, the lad mistook the beast's welcome for an attack, and shoved Pai out the way; immediately Takuhi ripped into the
lad, fatally wounding him. Unwilling to lose the boy she had been hunting for and just located, Pai's third eye opened, and she absorbed his soul. This restored his body, but tied him to her as her undead servant. Linked to her, he can only become human again when she becomes human. In the way of this goal are hordes of monsters and demons from the Shadow World, some desiring Pai's powers, others who seek the Ningen for their own. Yakumo can again become mortal and end his constant need to protect Pai because if Pai dies, then so will he. Along the way, they encounter many followers of the now-dead demon god Kaiyanwang, all of whom wish to kill Pai or siphon off her power in order to resurrect their deity and/or gain immortality.

Media

Manga

3×3 Eyes is written and illustrated by Yuzo Takada. It was first published for five chapters in Kodansha's Young Magazine Kaizokuban from December 14, 1987 to April 10, 1989, and later serialized in Weekly Young Magazine from 1989 to 2002. Kodansha collected its chapters in forty tankōbon volumes, released from October 17, 1988, to November 6, 2002. A limited edition of the final volume was released on the same day of the normal edition containing a video game for PC. Kodansha also released four special edition volumes. The first two were released on April 25, 2002. An additional box set was also released on the same day. The remaining two limited edition volumes were released on May 23, 2002. The manga was re-released into 24 volumes from August 12, 2009, to July 9, 2010. A limited edition of the final 24th volume was released on the same day as the normal edition containing a commemorative art book.

The English-language translation was originally published by Studio Proteus by Innovation Comics in 1991 (resulting in a five-issue miniseries), but in 1995 was published from the beginning by Dark Horse Comics after they purchased Studio Proteus, as well as serialized in Super Manga Blast! magazine. This release altered art to remove several instances of a "penis-like tentacle" emerging from a character's mouth in volume 2, this censorship was done with the approval of Yuzo Takada. A total of eight volumes were published between March 1, 1995, and May 5, 2004.

Sequels
A manga sequel, titled , began on Young Magazine Kaizokuban manga website (later renamed e Young Magazine in 2015) on December 26, 2014. The manga finished in August 2016 and was compiled into four volumes.

A second manga sequel, titled , started on December 22, 2016 on e Young Magazine online manga magazine. The manga was transferred to Monthly Young Magazine on February 20, 2019. The series entered its last stage in September 2021.

Original video animation
Two original video animations (OVAs) series were produced by Toei Animation and its subsidiary Studio Junio. The first shares the same name of the manga and was released as four episodes between July 25, 1991, and May 19, 1992. A sequel OVA entitled  was released as three episodes between July 25, 1995, to June 25, 1996. A four-disc Blu-ray box set was released on August 4, 2010. The first two discs contained episodes from the two OVAs, respectively. The additional other two discs are soundtrack from the OVAs.

The first OVA was originally dubbed and distributed in the United States by Streamline Pictures on four VHS tapes from November 1, 1992, to June 6, 1993, starring Eddie Frierson as Yakumo and Rebecca Forstadt as Pai. The episodes were later combined by Orion Home Video on a single volume, titled 3×3 Perfect Collection, released on LaserDisc on August 24, 1994, and on VHS on February 21, 1995. The first two episodes of second OVA were originally dubbed and distributed by Orion, before the company's bankruptcy in 1997, and MGM later distributed the previous available VHS volumes.

In 2001, the two OVAs were re-released in the United States by Pioneer Entertainment. The Pioneer release included a new English dub that starred Christian Campbell as Yakumo and Brigitte Bako as Pai. Directed by Greg Weisman, the dub also featured Keith David, Bill Fagerbakke, Thom Adcox-Hernandez, and Ed Asner, who all previously appeared with Bako in Weisman's series Gargoyles.

3×3 Eyes

Legend of the Divine Demon

Audio

Three Drama CDs have been released by King Records. The first is titled  and was released in Japan on September 5, 1990. The Drama CD titled,  was released in Japan on November 21, 1990. The third Drama CD titled,  was released in Japan on June 23, 1993.

Music for both anime OVA series were composed by Kaoru Wada and primarily performed by a group known as Takada Band. All soundtracks were released under its Star Child label. For the original OVA, a total of four soundtracks were released. The soundtrack titled,  was released in Japan on August 21, 1991. The second soundtrack titled,  was released in Japan on November 21, 1991. The third soundtrack titled,  was released in Japan on April 22, 1992. The fourth soundtrack titled 3×3 Eyes TAKADA BAND was released in Japan on June 24, 1992, and contains tracks primarily performed by Takada Band.

For the second OVA, 3×3 Eyes: Legend of the Divine Demon, two soundtracks have been released. The first soundtrack titled,  was released in Japan on July 5, 1995. The second soundtrack titled,  was released in Japan on June 5, 1996.

Kaoru Wada's theme song "Pai Longing" appears on 3×3 Eyes: Dai-ichi Shou (1991). Several reviewers have noted its resemblance to James Horner's theme song to the later 1995 Hollywood film Braveheart.

Video games

Various video games came out based on the 3×3 Eyes manga and OVA. Two video games were developed for the Super Famicom. The first titled,  was developed by Yutaka and released on July 28, 1992. The second titled,  was developed by Banpresto and released on December 22, 1995. A video game for the Sega Mega-CD titled,  was developed by Sega and released on July 23, 1993.

Nihon Create had developed three games for the 3×3 Eyes and ported to several consoles. The first video game developed by Nihon Create titled,  was released on PC-9801, FM Towns, PC-Engine, Windows 3.1, and Windows 95. The second video game developed by Nihon Create titled  was released on Windows 95, PlayStation, and Sega Saturn. The third video game developed by Nihon Create titled  was released on Windows 95, Windows 98, Windows 2000, Windows XP and PlayStation. The three games were collected in a 4-disc DVD box set titled 3×3 Eyes Memorial on December 13, 2002.

Other
Several companion books have been released for 3×3 Eyes manga. The first is titled  and released on April 24, 1998. The book features character and monster encyclopedia, commentary, crossword, stickers, and a short story titled  by Endo Akinori. A second book titled 3×3 Eyes Another World was released on April 1, 2001. It contains a special talk with Endo Akinori and interviews with the characters Pai and Yakumo.
An anthology book titled 3×3 Eyes Another Story was released on March 23, 2000, and contains short stories written by Endo Akinori, Katsumi Ishizuka, and Kusano Shinichi. A papercraft book titled  was released on May 24, 2000. A book titled  was released on April 6, 2001.

The German digital hardcore group Atari Teenage Riot used audio samples from the Streamline English dub of the first episode of 3×3 Eyes in their song "Start the Riot", released on the compilation album Burn, Berlin, Burn! in 1997 (song released in 1995). Alec Empire of Atari Teenage Riot also used samples from the first and second episodes of the Streamline dub on his 1996 solo album The Destroyer.

Reception
As of February 2015, 3×3 Eyes had over 33 million copies in circulation. In 1993, the manga won the Kodansha Manga Award for shōnen.

The OVA adaptation had received mixed to positive reviews. Theron Martin of Anime News Network praised both OVAs stating "While not a spectacular series, 3×3 Eyes is nonetheless a very solid production which should entertain those who don't mind high levels of bloodshed and rampant mystical content." Justin Sevakis also of Anime News Network, criticized the artstyle the animation quality of the series, whilst noting that the series is still entertaining. Carlos Ross of THEM Anime Reviews praised the first OVA for its animation and characters, but criticized the story for its "disjunctive nature" and "anticlimactic" ending. For the second OVA, Ross gave the plot a mix review noting that it is more coherent than the previous OVA, but also more confusing. Stig Høgset also of THEM Anime Reviews, gave both the OVAs a more positive review, praising the characters and artwork, but criticizing the ending for it feeling unfinished. Luis Cruz from Mania, gave the first OVA a mix review stating, "3×3 Eyes has the material to be a classic series However, the OVA format limits its potential by constraining the amount of time it can spend building the characters and their world." He continued to state for the second OVA, "It only falls short by being hobbled with a story arc conclusion rather than a proper ending" and "the story stands well enough on its own and provides nearly two hours of action, humor, and intriguing mysteries."

Notes

References

External links
 

1987 manga
1991 anime OVAs
1995 anime OVAs
Adventure anime and manga
Dark fantasy anime and manga
Dark Horse Comics titles
Geneon USA
Kodansha manga
Romance anime and manga
Seinen manga
Toei Animation original video animation
Winner of Kodansha Manga Award (Shōnen)
Video games developed in Japan
Video games set in Hong Kong